Anthurium (Schott, 1829) is a genus of about 1,000 species of flowering plants, the largest genus of the arum family, Araceae. General common names include anthurium, tailflower, flamingo flower, and laceleaf.

The genus is native to the Americas, where it is distributed from northern Mexico to northern Argentina and parts of the Caribbean.

Description and biology 
Anthurium is a genus of herbs often growing as epiphytes on other plants. Some are terrestrial. The leaves are often clustered and are variable in shape. The inflorescence bears small flowers which are perfect, containing male and female structures. The flowers are contained in close together spirals on the spadix. The spadix is often elongated into a spike shape, but it can be globe-shaped or club-shaped. Beneath the spadix is the spathe, a type of bract. This is variable in shape, as well, but it is lance-shaped in many species. It may extend out flat or in a curve. Sometimes it covers the spadix like a hood. The fruits develop from the flowers on the spadix. They are juicy berries varying in color, usually containing two seeds.

The spadix and spathe are a main focus of Anthurium breeders, who develop cultivars in bright colors and unique shapes. Anthurium scherzerianum and A. andraeanum, two of the most common taxa in cultivation, are the only species that grow bright red spathes. They have also been bred to produce spathes in many other colors and patterns.

Anthurium plants are poisonous due to calcium oxalate crystals. The sap is irritating to the skin and eyes.

Cultivation 

Like other aroids, many species of Anthurium plant can be grown as houseplants, or outdoors in mild climates in shady spots, including Anthurium crystallinum and Anthurium clarinervium with its large, velvety, dark green leaves and silvery white venation. Many hybrids are derived from Anthurium andraeanum or Anthurium scherzerianum because of their colorful spathes. They thrive in moist soils with high organic matter. In milder climates the plants can be grown in pots of soil. Wiping the leaves off with water will remove any dust and insects. Plants in pots with good root systems will benefit from a weak fertilizer solution every other week. In the case of vining or climbing Anthuriums, the plants benefit from being provided with a totem to climb.

Propagation
Anthurium can be propagated by seed or vegetatively by cuttings. In the commercial Anthurium trade, most propagation is via tissue culture.

Species 
For a full list, see the List of Anthurium species.

In 1860 there were 183 species known to science, and Heinrich Wilhelm Schott defined them in 28 sections in the book Prodromus Systematis Aroidearum. In 1905 the genus was revised with a description of 18 sections. In 1983 the genus was divided into the following sections:

 Belolonchium
 Calomystrium
 Cardiolonchium
 Chamaerepium
 Cordatopunctatum
 Dactylophyllium
 Decurrentia
 Digitinervium
 Gymnopodium
 Leptanthurium
 Pachyneurium
 Polyphyllium
 Polyneurium
 Porphyrochitonium
 Schizoplacium
 Semaeophyllium
 Tetraspermium
 Urospadix
 Xialophyllium

Gallery

See also 
 Spathiphyllum, similar looking plant genus of same family

References

External links 
 

 
Araceae genera